Jafarabad (also Romanized as Ja‘farābād) is a village in Bala Jam Rural District, Nasrabad District, Torbat-e Jam County, Razavi Khorasan Province, Iran. At the 2006 census, its population was 1,186, in 280 families.

References 

Populated places in Torbat-e Jam County